Matt Mundy is an Australian footballer who plays for Olympic FC.

Club career
He made his A-League debut for the Brisbane Roar on 4 October 2008 against Sydney FC.

Honors
With Brisbane Roar:
 A-League Premiership: 2010–2011
 A-League Championship: 2010–2011

A-League statistics

1 – includes A-League final series statistics
2 – includes FIFA Club World Cup statistics; AFC Champions League statistics are included in season commencing after group stages (i.e. ACL and A-League seasons etc.)

References

External links
Brisbane Roar profile

1987 births
Australian soccer players
Living people
A-League Men players
Brisbane Roar FC players
National Premier Leagues players
Association football defenders